The Great Escapists is a British television adventure-drama series starring Richard Hammond and Tory Belleci as fictionalized versions of themselves. Stranded on a deserted island, the two have to rely on makeshift machinery to survive while trying to find a way to escape. It was first broadcast by Amazon Prime Video on January 29, 2021, to mixed reviews.

Plot
Richard Hammond and Tory Belleci went on a fishing trip together, however; their boat has sunk in a storm. Stranded on an unnamed deserted island in the Pacific Ocean, the two use the remains of the boat to build makeshift machinery in order to escape the island. Just as Belleci is about to figure out a way to use the boat's sail to construct a float able to travel over high seas, Hammond secretly hides the sail, as he does not want their adventure to end prematurely. Thinking that there is no way to escape the island, Belleci resigns and the two build a large beach house that enables them to live on the island in comfort, using the island's resources for food and fresh water. While Belleci still tries to figure out ways to escape, a crazed Hammond continues to secretly sabotage all his efforts. As tensions rise between the two of them, Belleci, suspecting Hammond of sabotage, kicks him out of their beach house, starting a war between the two, where they repurpose most of their machinery into war machines and the house is largely destroyed. Ultimately, after being forced to reconcile, they build several flying machines to escape the island, the latest of which explodes, attracting South American police. The two are mistaken for drug traffickers and taken into custody. Questioned on their individual account of the story, both blame each other. In the end, they are released as no actual crime was committed, and Hammond  admits to Belleci that he sabotaged their escape attempts.

Cast
Richard Hammond as a fictionalized version of himself. A British motoring journalist, television presenter and author who became famous as the host of Top Gear and later on The Grand Tour.
Tory Belleci as a fictionalized version of himself. An American television presenter and model maker who became famous as a host of the science entertainment show MythBusters.

Additionally, Joseph Balderrama and Silvana Montoya feature as two South American police officers questioning Hammond and Belleci.

Production
Three years prior to filming, Hammond reached out to Belleci to work on a project together in an attempt to create a pop science show that had more substance. Belleci flew to London and over the next years, the concept for the show was developed. When speaking of the series, Hammond described as something entirely new, as it was a unique blend of "pop science, engineering, survival, and drama". The series was shot on location on several of the Pearl Islands off the Pacific Coast of Panama. Unlike their previous series, the show's events are entirely fictional and both star as fictionalized versions of themselves, similar to shows like Episodes. According to Belleci and Hammond, this decision was made as to not having to break the fourth wall continuously and create a more compelling narrative.

A trailer for the show was revealed on January 5, 2021, with the full show being released on Amazon Prime Video on the 29th of the same month.

Episodes

Reception
The series received mixed reviews and holds a 60% rating on review aggregator Rotten Tomatoes.

Several reviews highlighted that the show made good use of its scientific experiments. Writing for Metro, Tilly Pearce noted that the big science set pieces were the true stars of the show and that the series as a whole was the "perfect solution to teaching kids science". However, other critics found the show's premise to be hardly believable, as it was clearly evident that there was no way the two presenters could build their machines on their own, arguing that thus "their schtick doesn't land most of the time." Writing for The Telegraph, Anita Singh also concluded that there was no way for the audience to buy into the concept of the show.

Also, the chemistry between Hammond and Belleci was positively received, with Pearce stating that Hammond's childish antics matched well with Belleci's straight man persona. Nevertheless, Pearce noted that the acting was "clearly the weakest link in the series", as both stars were not trained actors.  Singh had similar sentiments, noting their "easy chemistry" that carried some of the segments, while the overall act seemed hardly believable.

Most critics centered on the weak plot of the series, which Pearce describes as "means-to-an-end" to keep the experiments together. Also, the series was found to lack direction, with Keller calling it an "odd show" that was lost between scripting and improvisation and had no clearly defined genre, with six episodes being clearly too long. Pearce also noted that there was no clear target audience recognizable, as it was unclear whether the show was aimed at adults or children. Singh had similar remarks, noting that the concept of the show was simply not working, as it was designed like a kids show, but seemingly aimed at adults.

References

External links
 The Great Escapists – Season 1 at Amazon
 

English-language television shows
2021 British television series debuts
2021 British television series endings
Amazon Prime Video original programming
Television shows filmed in Panama
Television series by Amazon Studios